Fajer Al-Saeed (Arabic:فجر السعيد; born 23 September 1967) is a Kuwaiti screenwriter, producer, and media writer. She is known for her writings dealing with controversial social issues.

Biography
At the beginning, Fajer Al-Saeed was writing on the radio, but her fame started with the first work she wrote for television, the series "The last decision" (original title: Al Qarar Al-Akheer). In addition to being a writer, she produces her own work through her company Scope Art Production. On 7 July 2007, she launched a television channel, Scope Channel affiliated with her company. At the present time, her company's work is not limited to producing works that she writes only, but has begun to expand since 2005 to produce works for other writers, Al-Saeed has stopped writing dramas since 2010.

Private life
Al-Saeed is the sister of the of Talal Al-Saeed, the former MP, poet and Journalist. On 21 March 2010, she marries the lawyer Saud Al-Subaie.

TV presenting 
In November 2018, she experimented with TV presenting on her channel Scope, in the political variety program "Here’s Kuwait" (original title: Hona Al-Kuwait).

In Ramadan 2019, She presented the program “Scope gathering” (original title: Ghabgah Scope).

Controversy 
On New Year's Eve 2019, Al-Saeed called for the normalization of relations with Israel and the investment of Arab capital in it, as she added in her tweet on Twitter: "I expect the New Year 2019, God willing, will be a year of goodness, security and safety, and on this happy occasion, I like to say to you, I strongly support normalization with the State of Israel, opening up trade with it, introducing Arab capital for investment and opening up tourism, especially religious tourism, Al-Aqsa, the Dome of the Rock and the Church of the Resurrection".

On 9 January 2019, Al-Saeed had an interview with the Israeli Kan channel and repeated her call for the normalization of relations with Israel and about "peace between the Arab peoples and Israel". 

She also criticized the rockets launched by the Palestinian resistance on 14 March 2019, during the Israeli military escalation on the Gaza Strip.

Disease 
In July 2019, she suffered a blood poisoning after undergoing gastric bypass surgery, which led to severe internal bleeding, as she was transferred to the hospital and was admitted to the recovery room in a critical condition.

Works

References

Living people
Kuwaiti writers
Kuwaiti screenwriters
21st-century Kuwaiti writers
1967 births